Angus Douglas (1 January 1889 – 14 December 1918) was a Scottish professional footballer who made over 140 appearances in the Football League for Chelsea and Newcastle United as an outside right. He was capped by Scotland at international level.

Club career 
A "tricky" outside right, Douglas began his career in Scotland with hometown club Lochmaben and transferred to Dumfries in 1906. In 1908, he moved to England to join First Division club Chelsea. He made 103 appearances and scored 11 goals in four-and-a-half years at Stamford Bridge and was a part of the club's 1911–12 Second Division promotion-winning team. After failing to appear at all during the early months of the 1913–14 season, Douglas transferred to First Division club Newcastle United in November 1913. He made 56 appearances and scored two goals for the club before the cessation of competitive football due to the outbreak of the First World War.

International career 
Douglas won one cap for Scotland, in a 2–0 British Home Championship victory over Ireland in March 1911.

Personal life 
Douglas worked in the munitions industry during the First World War and died of Spanish flu in December 1918, one month after the Armistice.

Career statistics

Honours 
Chelsea

 Football League Second Division second-place promotion: 1911–12

References

External links

1889 births
1918 deaths
Footballers from Dumfries and Galloway
Scottish footballers
Scotland international footballers
Chelsea F.C. players
Newcastle United F.C. players
Association football outside forwards
English Football League players
Kilmarnock F.C. players
Raith Rovers F.C. players
Deaths from the Spanish flu pandemic in England